An ansible is a category of fictional devices or technology capable of near-instantaneous or faster-than-light communication.

Ansible may also refer to:

 Ansible (software), open-source software provisioning, configuration management, and application-deployment tool
 Ansible (magazine), a newsletter by David Langford

See also